Sándor Szabó (29 March 1951 – 17 April 2021) was a Hungarian swimmer. He competed at the 1968 Summer Olympics and the 1972 Summer Olympics.

References

External links
 

1951 births
2021 deaths
Hungarian male swimmers
Olympic swimmers of Hungary
Swimmers at the 1968 Summer Olympics
Swimmers at the 1972 Summer Olympics
Swimmers from Budapest
20th-century Hungarian people
21st-century Hungarian people